Luis Eduardo Arellano Moreno (born January 4, 1989 in Caracas), is a Venezuelan professional footballer who plays for Spanish club Real Jaén as a goalkeeper.

References

External links

1989 births
Living people
Footballers from Caracas
Venezuelan footballers
Association football goalkeepers
Segunda División B players
Tercera División players
CD Tenerife B players
CD Tenerife players
Atlético Albacete players
Albacete Balompié players
CD Mensajero players
CF Badalona players
Real Jaén footballers
Atlético Astorga FC players
La Roda CF players